VIP Brother 4, also referred to as VIP Brother 2012 was the fourth season of the reality show VIP Brother in Bulgaria and the ninth season of the Big Brother format overall. It commenced on Nova Television on September 16, 2012 and lasted for two months, ending on November 17, 2012. It was immediately followed by an All-Stars edition. It was the first season to air more than two years after the family edition and more than three years after the third celebrity edition. Niki Kanchev returned as the show's main presenter for the Live shows on Monday on Wednesday (evictions and nominations, respectively), with Aleksandra Sarchadjieva being the presenter for the daily episodes.

VIP Brother 4 finished on Day 63, making it the longest celebrity edition of the format in Bulgaria so far. It was also the first and so far the only season with no voluntary exits by any Housemates. Orlin Pavlov won with Dimitar Kovachev "Funky" as the runner-up.

Production

Pre-season
On March 27, 2012 Endemol announced that a deal with Nova TV had been finalized for another two seasons to be aired.

On June 10, 2012 Nova TV confirmed that VIP Brother 4 would commence in September and that an all-stars edition of Big Brother would be aired after the finale at the end of 2012.

Logo
The official logo was the same as the one for Big Brother 13 UK. This logo was also used in the first season of Big Brother All Stars in Bulgaria.

Housemates
11 Housemates entered the House on Day 1, and another 5 on Day 2, including Pamela Anderson who was a houseguest for two. Ivan (also houseguest) and Ludmilla entered on Day 9, and Kamelia (as Sofia) on Day 11.

Iren and Vladimir were competing as one contestant.

Each Housemate had a necklace worth 10,000 leva. If evicted, the Housemate had to choose another Housemate to have their necklace.

Aksinia 

Aksinia Chenkova is a pop singer and a former Star Academy participant. She entered the House on Day 2 and was the second evicted on Day 16.

Blagoy 

Blagoy Ivanov "Bagata" is a sportsman and former boyfriend of Zlatka. He entered the House on Day 1 and finished fifth in the finale on Day 63.

Bonka 
Bonka Ilieva "Boni" is a pop-folk singer. She was the first Housemate to enter the House on Day 1. Big Brother gave her a secret mission to make strange comments to the other Housemates, otherwise they would not be given their suitcases. She was the fourth evicted on Day 30.

Dimitar 
Dimitar Kovachev "Funky" is a musician. His father is Bulgarian and his mother is Armenian. He entered the House on Day 2 and finished second in the finale on Day 63.

Julian 

Julian Konstantinov is an operah singer. He entered the House on Day 1 and was the seventh evicted on Day 44.

Iren & Vladimir 
Iren Krivoshieva and Vladimir Danailov are mother and son. Iren is an actress. Vladimir's father of the actor Stefan Danailov. They entered the House on Day 1 and were competing as a single contestant and was the third evicted on Day 23.

Kamelia 
Kamelia Veselinova is Ludmilla's girlfriend. She entered the House on Day 11 with a secret mission to convince the other Housemates that she is Sofia, a girl who had a controversial break-up with a German prince. If she completes her mission successfully, she will be allowed to stay in the House. Kamelia was the tenth evicted on Day 60.

Katsi 

Katsi Vaptsarov is an ex-TV host. He entered the House on Day 1 and finished third in the finale on Day 63.

Kristina 
Kristina Patrashkova is a journalist. She entered the House on Day 1 and was the fifth evicted on Day 37.

Ludmilla 

Ludmilla Diakovska "Lucy" is a pop singer from the girl band No Angels. She entered the House on Day 9 and was the ninth evicted on Day 58.

Mariana 

Mariana Popova is a pop singer. Her fiancé Veselin Plachkov entered six years later in VIP Brother 10 in 2018. She entered the House on Day 1 and was the eighth evicted on Day 51.

Nikol 
Nikol Stankulova is Nova TV's weather girl. She entered the House on Day 1 and finished fourth in the finale on Day 63.

Nikolay 
Nikolay Martinov is the winner of third season of Survivor. He entered the House on Day 1 and was the sixth evicted on Day 37.

Orlin 
Orlin Pavlov is a pop singer and an actor. His former girlfriend Yana Akimova entered six years later in VIP Brother 10 in 2018 with her husband Petko Dimitrov. He entered the House on Day 2 and became a winner on Day 63.

Sonya 
Sonya Koltuklieva is a journalist. She entered the House on Day 2 and was the first evicted on Day 9.

Zlatka 
Zlatka Dimitrova is a model, actress, former Miss Playmate and former girlfriend of Blagoy. She entered the House on Day 1 and was the eleventh evicted on Day 60.

Houseguests

Ivan 
Ivan Laskin is an actor and Aleksandra Sarchadjieva's husband. He entered the House on Day 9 and left on Day 30.

Lyuben 
Lyuben Dilov-son is a journalist and writer. He entered the House on Day 44 and left on Day 51.

Pamela 

On September 9 it was officially announced that Pamela Anderson entered the House on the show's launch night. She entered the House on Day 2 as a special Houseguest and left on Day 4.

Vyara, Nadezhda & Lyubov 
Vyara, Nadezhda and Lyubov Stanchevi are identical triplets. Lyubov was the winner of Big Brother 3. She and her sisters, who were also participants in the third season of Big Brother in 2006, entered the House on Day 37. They were the first Housemates confirmed to participate in Big Brother All-Stars, which commenced after the VIP Brother 4 finale.

Nominations table

Notes

 : Mariana had to save two people from her team from nominations. She chose Orlin and Katsi to be immuned.
 : Orlin had to save two people from his team from nominations. He chose Ludmilla and Dimitar to be immuned.
 : Kamelia had to save one person from her team from nominations. She chose Nikol to be immuned.

References

External links
 Official website

2012 Bulgarian television seasons
VIP Brother seasons
2012 Bulgarian television series endings